The 2017 Virginia Tech Hokies football team represented Virginia Polytechnic Institute and State University during the 2017 NCAA Division I FBS football season. The Hokies were led by second-year head coach Justin Fuente and played their home games at Lane Stadium in Blacksburg, Virginia. Virginia Tech competed as members of the Coastal Division of the Atlantic Coast Conference. They finished the season 9–4, 5–3 in ACC play to finish in second place in the Coastal Division. They were invited to the Camping World Bowl where they lost to Oklahoma State.

Previous season 
The Hokies finished the 2016 season 10–4, 6–2 in ACC play to win its sixth ACC Coastal Division title. In the ACC Championship, the Hokies fell to eventual National Champion Clemson. The Hokies were invited to the Belk Bowl where they defeated Arkansas, scoring 35 unanswered points to win the game 35–24, the greatest comeback in team history.

Coaching staff

Schedule

Schedule source

Game summaries

vs West Virginia

In the first game of the season at FedExField in Landover, Maryland, Hokies quarterback Josh Jackson ran for a touchdown and threw another as the Hokies held off No. 22-ranked West Virginia 31–24. In the 52nd meeting between the two schools, a back-and-forth matchup was decided in the fourth quarter when Jackson rushed for a 46-yard gain to set up Travon McMillion's three-yard touchdown run with 6:30 left in the game. The Hokie defense, which gave up 592 total yards to the Mountaineers, came up big at the end, keeping West Virginia out of the endzone after two attempts from the 15-yard line as time expired. The win moved the Hokies to 1–0 on the season.

Delaware

The Hokies announced they would wear new "white Hokie stone" helmets for their first home game of the year against FCS Delaware. After allowing nearly 600 yards to West Virginia, Virginia Tech's defense rebounded nicely to record Bud Foster's 32nd shutout as the Hokies' defensive coordinator. The Blue Hens only got into Virginia Tech territory three times. Another Hokie hallmark, special teams, played an important role as Greg Stroman returned a punt for a touchdown late in the first quarter to give the Hokies a 7–0 lead. Quarterback Josh Jackson threw two scoring passes in the game as the Hokies were held to only 303 yards of total offense. However, it was enough as the Hokies moved to 2–0 on the season with a 27–0 win.

at East Carolina

Virginia Tech traveled to Greenville, North Carolina to take on East Carolina in a non-conference game. Things did not start well for the Hokies as the Pirates took an early 7–0 and then 17–7 lead as the first quarter ended. VT responded quickly thereafter, getting a touchdown catch from Cam Phillips and three Joey Slye field goals in the second quarter to take the lead at the half 23–17. In the second half the Hokies ran away with the game scoring five touchdowns in the third quarter to take a 57–17 lead. Four of the third quarter touchdowns were passes from quarterback Josh Jackson. Another touchdown in the fourth quarter gave the Hokies a 64–17 win over East Carolina.

The Hokies rushed for 287 yards and Jackson passed for 388 yards and five touchdowns in the blowout. Phillips set a school record with 14 catches for 189 yards in the game. Meanwhile, the Hokie defense held the Pirates to only 281 total yards. The win moved the Hokies to 3–0 on the season.

Old Dominion

Clemson

at Boston College

North Carolina

Duke

at Miami (FL)

at Georgia Tech

Pittsburgh

at Virginia

vs. Oklahoma State-Camping World Bowl

Honorary #25 Beamer Jersey 
Since the start of the 2016 season, two days prior to each game, Head Coach Justin Fuente has selected an outstanding special teams player to wear the #25 jersey in honor of former head coach, Frank Beamer, who wore #25 as a player for Virginia Tech.

The players honored in the 2017 season are:

2018 NFL Draft

The Hokies had five players selected in the 2018 NFL draft.  The Edmunds brothers were both selected in the first round.

Rankings

References

External links

Virginia Tech
Virginia Tech Hokies football seasons
Virginia Tech Hokies football